Julius Onah (born February 10, 1983) is a Nigerian-American filmmaker and occasional actor.

Early life 
Onah was born in Makurdi, Benue State in Nigeria. His father Adoga Onah, was a Nigerian diplomat. He was raised in the Philippines, Nigeria, Togo and the United Kingdom before moving to Arlington County, Virginia. Onah graduated from Washington-Lee High School in Arlington, VA and received his B.A. in theater from Wesleyan University in Middletown, Connecticut. He completed an M.F.A. from the graduate film program at the Tisch School of the Arts at New York University where he was selected as a Dean's Fellow. He is also a recipient of the prestigious Jack Kent Cooke Foundation Scholarship.

His twin brother, Anthony Onah, is also a director, with his first feature film The Price released in 2017.

Career 
Onah's work has screened at festivals around the world including Sundance, Berlin, Tribeca, London, Dubai, Los Angeles, Melbourne and Camerimage. In the summer of 2010, he was selected as one of Filmmaker magazine's New Faces of Independent Film. In 2013, he was selected as one of Studio System's 10 Up and Up Feature Directors and Forbes Magazine's 13 African Celebrities To Watch. While at NYU's graduate film program he completed his first feature as his thesis, The Girl Is in Trouble (2015) with executive producer Spike Lee, featuring Alicja Bachleda, Wilmer Valderrama, Columbus Short, and Jesse Spencer. Onah was previously set to direct thriller film adaptation Brilliance for Legendary Pictures which David Koepp scripted with Will Smith and Noomi Rapace to star as leads. He then directed The Cloverfield Paradox (2018) with producer J. J. Abrams. His latest film, Luce featuring Naomi Watts, Octavia Spencer, Tim Roth and Kelvin Harrison Jr., premiered at the 2019 Sundance Film Festival. He is set to direct thriller film Bad Genius, a remake of the 2017 Thai film of the same name. He is also set to direct Captain America: New World Order, the fourth Captain America movie in the Marvel Cinematic Universe, with Anthony Mackie starring in the titular role.

Filmography

Open Continents 
Open Continents is a global media project comprising Onah's short, feature, music video and television work.

References

External links 
 
 
 Open Continents

1983 births
Living people
Horror film directors
Film directors from Virginia
People from Arlington County, Virginia
Wesleyan University alumni
Tisch School of the Arts alumni
Washington-Liberty High School alumni